The Krym Battalion is a Ukrainian military volunteer unit subordinated to the Ministry of Internal Affairs of Ukraine. Created in June 2014, until March 2015, it participated in Anti-terrorist operations in Eastern Ukraine as part of a company of the Special Tasks Patrol Police unit Dnipro-1. The Battalion is based in Kherson.

On November 12, 2014, the President of Ukraine, Petro Poroshenko, and the leader of the Crimean Tatar national movement, Mustafa Dzhemilev, announced the reformation of the Crimean Tatar company into a battalion.

In March 2022, it joined the International Legion of Territorial Defense of Ukraine.

Formation

On April 14, 2014, then head of the Ministry of Internal Affairs of Ukraine, Arsen Avakov, signed an order on the creation of regional special units of the special police patrol service (ПСМОП), subordinate to the Ministry of Internal Affairs, based on civilian organizations.

In a short period of time, the Ministry of Internal Affairs formed 30 volunteer battalions and companies of the special police patrol service with a total number of 5,660 people in different regions of Ukraine.

But at the same time, the Ministry of Internal Affairs and Communications of Ukraine in the Autonomous Republic of Crimea was de facto liquidated, which created a bureaucratic obstacle to the formation of a volunteer battalion based on the Crimean Tatar civil movement.

In early June, Dmytro Yarosh wrote on social media about the creation of a Crimean Tatar battalion under the auspices of the Right Sector to wage a partisan struggle on the peninsula. This project of Yarosh was not implemented.

In mid-June 2014, Semen Semenchenko, the commander of the newly created Donbas Battalion of the National Guard of Ukraine tried to overcome bureaucratic obstacles. He announced a plan to form a "rym Battalion" of the National Guard as part of a future Independent National Guard Brigade «Donbas».

Combat
As part of an Independent "Crimean company" of the Dnipro-1 Regiment, volunteers took part in the Battle in Shakhtarsk Raion and the Battle of Ilovaisk, where they were surrounded. "Crimea" fighters reached Ilovaisk on August 19–20, when the threat of encirclement was already hanging over the volunteer battalions.

On August 29, the head of Sector "B" (Сектор "Б"), General Ruslan Khomchak, gave the command to withdraw from the encirclement with a retreat in two columns. "Crimea" fighters moved in a column of the "Dnipro-1" battalion. In the area of the village of Chabany, near Starobesheve, they came under fire, after which they broke through the encirclement in small groups. On August 30–31, reports about their breakthrough appeared in the press and social networks. During the escape from encirclement, the personnel of the «Krym» Battalion experienced losses.

Current Status
Mustafa Dzhemilev said that as of mid-November 2014, about 450 Crimean Tatars defended the sovereignty and independence of Ukraine in the ATO zone

.

References 

History of Crimea
History of Donetsk Oblast
Military units and formations established in 2014
2014 establishments in Ukraine